The 2005 Belgian Figure Skating Championships took place between 26 and 27 November 2004 in Lommel. Skaters competed in the discipline of ladies' singles.

Senior results

Ladies

External links
 results

Belgian Figure Skating Championships
2004 in figure skating
Belgian Figure Skating Championships, 2005